Stonehenge is a 1970 album by folk rock musician Richie Havens.

Track listing
Except where otherwise noted, all tracks composed by Richie Havens
"Open Our Eyes" (Leon Lumpkins) – 2:56
"Minstrel from Gault" 	(Havens, Mark Roth) – 3:35
"It Could Be the First Day" - 2:22
"Ring Around the Moon" (Greg Brown, Havens) - 2:08
"It's All Over Now, Baby Blue" (Bob Dylan) - 5:01
"There's a Hole in the Future" - 2:07
"I Started a Joke" (Barry, Robin & Maurice Gibb) - 2:58
"Prayer" - 2:56
"Tiny Little Blues" - 2:08
"Shouldn't All the World Be Dancing?" - 8:04

Personnel
Richie Havens - guitar, autoharp, sitar, koto, vocals
David Bromberg - dobro
Warren Bernhardt - organ
Daniel Ben Zebulon - drums, conga
Monte Dunn - guitar
Donny Gerrard - bass
Ken Lauber - piano
Bill LaVorgna - drums
Eric Oxendine - bass
Donald McDonald - drums
Bill Shepherd - string arrangements
Paul "Dino" Williams - guitar
Technical
Val Valentin - director of engineering
Al Manger and Bernie Fox - recording and remix engineers
Sid Maurer - art direction
Mark Roth - cover design, photography

External links 
 

Richie Havens albums
1970 albums
Verve Forecast Records albums